Formozotroctes toulgoeti is a species of beetle in the family Cerambycidae, the only species in the genus Formozotroctes.

References

Acanthoderini